The 1959 San Francisco mayoral election was held on November 3, 1959, with incumbent George Christopher being reelected with 59% percent of the vote.

Results

References 

San Francisco mayoral election
Mayoral elections in San Francisco
San Francisco
Mayoral election
San Francisco mayoral election